In early 2012 the original line-up of The Mutton Birds reunited after 10 years for a series of concerts in New Zealand. This album 'Free Range – The Mutton Birds Live 2012' is a record of an intimate show at the King's Arms in Auckland.

Track listing
"Envy of Angels" – 6.54
"Dominion Road" – 4.29
"In My Room" – 4.17
"A Thing Well Made" – 
"Too Close To The Sun" – 5.52
"Come Around" – 3.56
"Trouble With You" – 4.42
"Queen’s English" – 7.49
"The Heater" – 4.13
"Along The Boundary" – 4.36
"White Valiant" – 5.34
"Nature" – 6.38
"Anchor Me" – 5.34

Credits

Musicians
Don McGlashan – Voice, Guitars, Euphonium
Ross Burge – Drums
Alan Gregg – Bass, Voice
David Long – Lead Guitar

Recording
Recorded at "The King's Arms" Auckland, 29 February 2012. Recorded and mixed by Andre Upston of Radio New Zealand.

References

The Mutton Birds albums
2000 live albums